This is a list of theaters designated for the express purpose of presenting and producing dance performances. Dance venues such as these often have particular attributes including sprung floors and steeply raked seating areas.  In addition, these spaces commonly convert into rehearsal spaces or dance studios equipped with mirrors.

Belgium
La Monnaie – Brussels

England
Laban Theatre – South East London
The King's Hall – Herne Bay, Kent; auditorium doubles as dance area with sprung floor
The Place: Centre for Contemporary Dance – London

France
Opéra de Paris
Opéra Bastille – Paris
Théâtre de la Ville – Paris

Poland
Kraków Dance Theatre

United States
Ailey Citigroup Theater – New York City
Theater at Cedar Lake Contemporary Ballet – New York City
Cowles Center for Dance and the Performing Arts – Minneapolis, Minnesota
Dance Place – Washington, DC
Dance Theater Workshop – New York City
Danspace Project – New York City
England Studio Theater – Washington, DC
Joan W. and Irving B. Harris Theater for Music and Dance – Chicago, Illinois
Jacob's Pillow – Becket, Massachusetts
Joyce Theater – New York City
Merce Cunningham Studio – New York City
New York Live Arts – New York City
Performance Garage – Philadelphia, Pennsylvania

Theatres
Dance